Mohamed Makhlouf (born 10 November 1957) is a Syrian middle-distance runner. He competed in the men's 800 metres at the 1980 Summer Olympics.

References

1957 births
Living people
Athletes (track and field) at the 1980 Summer Olympics
Syrian male middle-distance runners
Olympic athletes of Syria
Place of birth missing (living people)
20th-century Syrian people